Lynn Lake (Eldon Lake) Water Aerodrome  is located  south southeast of Lynn Lake, Manitoba, Canada.

See also
Lynn Lake Airport

References

Registered aerodromes in Manitoba
Seaplane bases in Manitoba